Charles Maxwell may refer to:

 Charles Maxwell (actor) (1913–1993), American character actor and television producer
 Charles Maxwell (radio producer) (1910–1998), British radio producer
 Charles William Maxwell (1775–?), British soldier and colonial administrator